Joanne Lesley Palmer (née Dick, formerly Cornish; born 10 April 1971) is an Australian politician and former television journalist and newsreader.

Palmer was born in Christchurch, New Zealand, and moved to Tasmania as a baby after being adopted by an Australian family.

Originally employed by the station in Hobart as a journalist, she is a former Miss Tasmania and in 1993 she was awarded Miss Australia. She presented the hour-long Nightly News on 7 Tasmania, until leaving 7 Tasmania after 18 years to spend more time with her family.

Palmer was elected to the Tasmanian Legislative Council for the division of Rosevears at the 2020 Tasmanian Legislative Council periodic election, representing the Liberal Party.

In April 2022, Palmer was elevated to cabinet and was appointed as Minister for Primary Industries and Water, Minister for Disability Services and Minister for Women.

References

External links
Tasmanian Parliament profile

1971 births
Living people
Australian television newsreaders and news presenters
Tasmanian newsreaders and news presenters
Politicians from Launceston, Tasmania
Australian beauty pageant winners
Australian women television journalists
Members of the Tasmanian Legislative Council
Liberal Party of Australia members of the Parliament of Tasmania
Women members of the Tasmanian Legislative Council
New Zealand emigrants to Australia
21st-century Australian politicians
21st-century Australian women politicians